James Marshall Hanger (November 12, 1833 – August 26, 1912) was a Virginia politician.  He represented Augusta County in the Virginia House of Delegates, and served as that body's Speaker from 1871 until 1877. He was elected over C. P. Ramsdell.

In 1881 Isaac C. Fowler was elected speaker over him.

The Hanger family established itself in Augusta County in 1750 with Peter Hanger's arrival from Pennsylvania.

References

External links
 
 

1833 births
1912 deaths
Consuls General of the United States in Bermuda
Speakers of the Virginia House of Delegates
People from Augusta County, Virginia
19th-century American politicians